Tarkesh-e Sofla (also Romanized as Tarkesh-e Soflá; also known as Tarkash, Tarkesh, and Tīrkesh-e Pā'īn) is a village in Mangur-e Gharbi Rural District, in the Central District of Piranshahr County, West Azerbaijan Province, Iran. At the 2006 census, its population was 40, in 6 families.

References 

Populated places in Piranshahr County